The 1978 Rudé Právo Cup was the second edition of the Rudé Právo Cup ice hockey tournament. The Soviet Union won the tournament by defeating Czechoslovakia in all three games played.

Tournament

Results

Final standings

References

External links
Tournament on hockeyarchives.ru

1978
1978–79 in Soviet ice hockey
1978–79 in Czechoslovak ice hockey
1978